The 1967 Mysore State Legislative Assembly election was held in the Indian state of Mysore (currently Karnataka) to elect 216 members to the Mysore Legislative Assembly.

Results 

!colspan=10|
|- align=center
!style="background-color:#E9E9E9" class="unsortable"|
!style="background-color:#E9E9E9" align=center|Political Party
!style="background-color:#E9E9E9" |Contestants
!style="background-color:#E9E9E9" |Seats won
!style="background-color:#E9E9E9" |Seat change
!style="background-color:#E9E9E9" |Number of votes
!style="background-color:#E9E9E9" |Vote share
!style="background-color:#E9E9E9" |Net change
|- style="background: #90EE90;"
| 
|align="left"|Indian National Congress||216||126|| 12||3,636,374||48.43%|| 1.79
|-
| 
|align="left"|Praja Socialist Party||52||20|| 0 ||666,662||8.88%|| 5.20
|-
| 
|align="left"|Swatantra Party||45||16|| 7||497,055 ||6.62%|| 0.53
|-
| 
|align="left"|Samyukta Socialist Party||17||6||||185,222||2.47%||
|-
| 
|align="left"|Bharatiya Jana Sangh||37||4||||211,966||2.82%||
|-
| 
|align="left"|Communist Party of India||10||1||||82,531||1.10%||N/A
|-
| 
|align="left"|Republican Party of India||12||1||||57,739||0.77%||N/A
|-
| 
|align="left"|Communist Party of India||6||1||||38,737||0.52%||N/A
|-
| 
|align="left"|Independents||||41|| 14||2,129,786||28.36%||N/A
|-
|
|align="left"|Total||||216||||''''''||||
|-
|}

Elected members

References

Mysore
State Assembly elections in Karnataka
Government of Mysore